This is a list of Danish television related events from 1993.

Events
3 April - Tommy Seebach Band are selected to represent Denmark at the 1993 Eurovision Song Contest with their song "Under stjernerne på himlen". They are selected to be the twenty-sixth Danish Eurovision entry during Dansk Melodi Grand Prix held at the Odense Kongrescenter in Odense.

Debuts

Television shows

Births

Deaths

See also
1993 in Denmark